The Old Spot Inn is a pub in Dursley, Gloucestershire, England.

It was CAMRA's National Pub of the Year for 2007.

References

External links
 

Pubs in Gloucestershire
Dursley